Sanu Siva was a Nepalese politician, belonging to the Nepal Communist Party currently serving as the member of the 1st Federal Parliament of Nepal. In the 2017 Nepalese general election she was elected as a proportional representative from Dalit category.

She died in 2020 due to health complication related to kidney and heart. She was also a central member of the People’s Cultural Federation and has sung more than 25 songs. She has a son and a daughter.

References

2020 deaths
Nepalese politicians
Nepalese women
Nepal MPs 2017–2022
Year of birth missing
Nepal Communist Party (NCP) politicians
Communist Party of Nepal (Unified Marxist–Leninist) politicians